(20 August 192022 February 2012)  was a Japanese kabuki actor most known for onnagata performance.

Biography
In 1991 the Japanese government designated him as a Living National Treasure.

Filmography
1954 The Woman in the Rumor(Uwasa no Onna) as Dr. Matoba

Further reading
Beautiful boys/outlaw bodies: devising Kabuki female-likeness, 2005, By Katherine Mezur
Nakamura Jakuemon IV: The Art of Onnagata Acting, 2005, by Rei Sasaguchi

References

External links
 (Japanese)
biography

Kabuki actors
1920 births
2012 deaths
Deaths from pneumonia in Japan
Cross-gender male actors